Special cities are one of the first-level administrative divisions within North Korea. There are four special cities in North Korea.

Position in hierarchy and types
Special cities are the higher-ranked administrative divisions in North Korea. There are three kinds of special cities in North Korea.

The first level cities have equal status to the provinces.

List of special cities

Note: Pyongyang is classified as a capital city (chikhalsi), not a special city as Seoul in South Korea. In fact, the North Korean national newspaper and broadcasting say "Pyongyang Chikhalsi". Some sources, most of them coming from South Korea, refer the city as a special city; however, these are old sources. Moreover, South Korea has corrected the city as a directly governed city, according to a South Korean newspaper in 1994. The official name of Pyongyang would be  "Pyongyang-si" in the Republic of Korea, which officially claims to represent the entire peninsula.

List of defunct special cities

See also

 Administrative divisions of North Korea
 List of cities in North Korea
 Special cities of South Korea

References

Further reading 

Dormels, Rainer. North Korea's Cities: Industrial facilities, internal structures and typification. Jimoondang, 2014. 

 
Special cities